The 2007 South American Ski Mountaineering Championship was the second edition of a South American continental championship of competition ski mountaineering,

The event was sanctioned by the International Council for Ski Mountaineering Competitions (ISMC) and organized by the Federación Chilena de Andinismo (FEACH). The event was held in Termas de Chillán from 22 to 23 September 2007. 62 racers participated in the event, 28 came from Argentina and two from Venezuela.

Results 
Event was held on the Cerro Bayo on September 23, 2007. 

The male youth class competitors had to run the same course as the senior racers. The results were added in the "International Open" ranking. (italic in the men's ranking list below)

List of the best 10 participants by gender:

References 

2007
South American Ski Mountaineering Championship
International sports competitions hosted by Chile
South American Ski Mountaineering Championship
Sport in Biobío Region
Skiing in Chile